The continent of Europe comprise a large part of the Palearctic ecozone, with many unique biomes and ecoregions. Biogeographically, Europe is tied closely to Siberia, commonly known as the Euro-Siberian region.

The European Environmental Agency (EEA) divides Europe into a total of eleven terrestrial biogeographical regions and seven regional seas. The agency has issued the Digital Map of European Ecological Regions (DMEER), and operates with a total of 70 ecoregions, of which 58 are within the European continent. Some of these ecoregions are congruent with the World Wildlife Fund's (WWF) ecoregions, and some are not.

List of ecoregions in Europe 
Below is an exhaustive list of the ecoregions of Europe as defined by the WWF.

Global 200 ecoregions in Europe

Terrestrial 
Terrestrial Global 200 ecoregions in Europe comprise three regions of Scandia alpine tundra and taiga, which is present in Finland, Norway, Russia and Sweden:
 PA0608 Scandinavian and Russian taiga
 PA1106 Kola Peninsula tundra
 PA1110 Scandinavian montane birch forest and grasslands

Other Global 200 ecoregions:
 PA1214 Mediterranean forests, woodlands, and scrub

Freshwater 
Global 200 Large river delta ecoregions in Europe:
 Volga River Delta (Kazakhstan, Russia)
 Danube delta (Bulgaria, Moldova, Romania, Ukraine, Yugoslavia)

Small river ecoregions:
 Balkan rivers and streams (Albania, Bosnia and Herzogovina, Bulgaria, Croatia, Greece, Macedonia, Turkey, Yugoslavia)

Marine
There are no marine Global 200 ecoregions in Europe.

Sources

References

External links 
Maps and basic data.

Environment of Europe
Ecoregions
Ecoregions of Europe
Lists of ecoregions
Natural history of Europe
Palearctic ecoregions